This is a list of high schools in Melbourne, Australia.

A

Ave Maria College, Melbourne

B
 Balwyn High School
 Bayswater Secondary College
 Beaconhills College
 Belgrave Heights Christian School
 Bentleigh Secondary College
 Berwick Secondary College
 Beth Rivkah Ladies College
 Bialik College
 Billanook College
 Blackburn High School
 Boronia Heights College
 Box Forest Secondary College
 Box Hill High School
 Box Hill Senior Secondary College
 Braybrook College
 Brentwood Secondary College
 Brighton Grammar School
 Brighton Secondary College
 Brimbank College
 Broadmeadows Secondary College
 Brunswick Secondary College
 Buckley Park College
 Bundoora Secondary College

C
 Camberwell Girls Grammar School
 Camberwell Grammar School
 Camberwell High School
 Canterbury Girls' Secondary College
 Carey Baptist Grammar School
 Caroline Springs College
 Caroline Chisholm Catholic College, Melbourne
 Carrum Downs Secondary College
 Carwatha College, Melbourne
 Catholic Ladies' College
 Catholic Regional College (Sydenham)
 Caulfield Grammar School
 Chandler Secondary College
 Cheltenham Secondary College
 Christian Brothers College
 Cleeland Secondary College
 Coburg High School
 Collingwood College, Victoria
 Coomoora Secondary College
 Copperfield College
 Cornish College
 Craigieburn Secondary College
 Cranbourne Christian College
 Cranbourne Secondary College
 Croydon Secondary College

D
 Dandenong High School
 De La Salle College (Australia)
 Debney Park Secondary College
 Deer Park Secondary College
 Diamond Valley College
 Distance Education Centre, Victoria
 Doncaster Secondary College
 Doveton Secondary College
 Dromana Secondary College
 Darul Ulum College of Victoria

E
 East Doncaster Secondary College
 East Preston Islamic College
 Elisabeth Murdoch College
 Eltham College of Education
 Eltham High School
 Elwood College
 Emerald Secondary College
 Emmaus College
 Emmanual College (Point Cook)
 Epping Secondary College
 Erinbank Secondary College
 Essendon Keilor College
 Eumemmerring College

F
 Fairhills High School
 Fawkner College
 Ferntree Gully College
 Fintona Girls' School
 Firbank Girls' Grammar School
 Fitzroy High School
 Flinders Christian Community College
 Footscray City College
 Forest Hill College
 Frankston High School
 Fountain Gate Secondary College

G
 Galvin Park Secondary College
 Genazzano FCJ College
 Gilmore College for Girls
 Gilson College
 Gladstone Park Secondary College
 Glen Eira College
 Glen Waverley Secondary College
 Greensborough Secondary College
 Galen Catholic College
 Gleneagles Secondary College

H
 Haileybury College, Melbourne
 Hampton Park Secondary College
 Hawthorn Secondary College
 Hays International College
 Healesville High School
 Heathdale Christian College
 Heatherhill Secondary College
 Heatherton Christian College
 Heathmont College
 Highvale Secondary College
 Hillcrest Christian College
 Hillcrest Secondary College
 Hoppers Crossing Secondary College
 Huntingtower School
 Harboury school
 HollyJoan Secondary College
 Hume Central Secondary College

I
 Ilim College of Australia
 Isik College
 Ivanhoe Girls' Grammar School
 Ivanhoe Grammar School
 ICA Casey College

J
 John Paul College
 John Monash Science School

K
 Kamaruka
 Kambrya College
 Kurunjang Secondary College
 Karingal Park Secondary College
 Kealba Secondary College
 Keilor Downs College
 Kew High School
 Kilbreda College
 Killester College
 Kilvington Baptist Girls' Grammar School
 King Khalid Islamic College
 Kingswood College
 Koonung Secondary College
 Kolbe Catholic College
 Korowa Anglican Girls' School
 Kurunjang Secondary College
 Keysborough College

L
 La Trobe Secondary College
 Lakeside Secondary College
 Lakeview Senior College
 Lalor North Secondary College
 Lalor Secondary College
 Lauriston Girls' School
 Laverton Secondary College
 Leibler Yavneh College
 Lighthouse Christian College
 Lilydale Adventist Academy
 Lilydale Heights College
 Lilydale High School
 Loreto Mandeville Hall
 Lowther Hall Anglican Grammar School
 Loyola College, Melbourne
 Luther College (Victoria)
 Lynall Hall Community School
 Lyndale Secondary College
 Lyndhurst Secondary College

M
 Mackillop Catholic Regional College
 Macleod College
 Mac.Robertson Girls' High School
 Maranatha Christian School
 Marcellin College
 Marian College (Sunshine West)
 Maribyrnong Secondary College
 Maroondah Secondary College
 Mater Christi College
 Mazenod College
 McClelland Secondary College
 McKinnon Secondary College
 Melbourne Girls' College
 Melbourne Girls' Grammar School
 Melbourne Grammar School
 Melbourne High School
 Melbourne Rudolf Steiner School
 Melton Christian College
 Melton Secondary College
 Mentone Girls' Grammar School
 Mentone Girls' Secondary College
 Mentone Grammar School
 Mercy Diocesan College
 Merrilands College
 Methodist Ladies' College
 Mill Park Secondary College
 Minaret College
 Monash Secondary College
 Monbulk College
 Monterey Secondary College
 Montmorency Secondary College
 Mooroolbark College
 Mordialloc Secondary College
 Mornington Secondary College
 Mount Eliza Secondary College
 Mount Erin College
 Mount Evelyn Christian School
 Mount Lilydale Mercy College
 Mount Scopus Memorial College
 Mount St Joseph Girls' College
 Mount Waverley Secondary College
 Mountain District Christian School
 Mowbray at Brookside
 Mowbray College
 Mullauna College

N
 Narre Warren South College
 Nazareth College, Melbourne
 New Generation College
 Niddrie Secondary College
 Noble Park Secondary College
 Northcote High School
 Northland Secondary College
 Northside Christian College
 Norwood Secondary College
 Nossal High School
 Nunawading Christian College

O
 Oakleigh Greek Orthodox College
 Our Lady of Mercy College
 Our Lady of Sacred Heart College
 Our Lady of Sion College
 Overnewton Anglican Community College
 Oxley College (Chirnside Park, Victoria)
 Ozford College

P
 Padua College, Melbourne
 Pakenham Secondary College
 Parade College
 Parkdale Secondary College
 Parkwood Secondary College
 Pascoe Vale Girls' Secondary College
 Patterson River Secondary College
 Pembroke Secondary College
 Penleigh and Essendon Grammar School
 Penola Catholic College
 Peter Lalor Secondary College
 Plenty Valley Christian College
 Plenty Valley Christian School
 Presbyterian Ladies' College, Melbourne
 Presentation College, Melbourne
 Preshil, The Margaret Lyttle Memorial School
 Preston Girls' Secondary College
 Princes Hill Secondary College

R
 Reservoir District Secondary College
 Ringwood Secondary College
 Rosebud Secondary College
 Rowville Secondary College
 Roxburgh College
 Ruyton Girls' School
 Presbyterian Ladies' College

S
 Sacré Cœur School
 Sacred Heart College, Oakleigh
 Sacred Heart Girls' College
 Salesian College
 Samaritan Catholic College
 Sandringham College
 Santa Maria College
 Scoresby Secondary College
 Scotch College, Melbourne
 Shelford Anglican Girls' School
 Shelford Girls Grammar School
 Sherbrooke Community School
 Siena College
 Simonds Catholic College
 sirius college
 South Oakleigh Secondary College
 Sophia Mundi Steiner School
 Southwood Boys' Grammar School
 Springvale Secondary College
 St Albans Secondary College
 St Aloysius' College
 St Andrew's Christian College
 St Anthony's Coptic Orthodox College
 St Bede's College (Mentone)
 St. Bernard's College, Melbourne
 St Catherine's School, Toorak
 St. Columba's College, Melbourne
 St Francis Xavier College, Melbourne
 St Helena Secondary College
 St John's Greek Orthodox College
 St John's Regional College
 St. Joseph's College, Melbourne
 St. Joseph's College, Ferntree Gully
 St. Kevin's College, Melbourne
 St Leonards College
 St Margaret's School, Melbourne
 St Mary's Coptic Orthodox College
 St Michael's Grammar School
 St Monica's College
 St Paul's Anglican Grammar School
 St. Paul's College, Melbourne
 St Peter's College, Cranbourne
 St Thomas Aquinas College
 Star of the Sea College
 Staughton College
 Stott's College
 Strathcona Baptist Girls' Grammar School
 Strathmore Secondary College
 Sunbury College
 Sunbury Downs Secondary College
 Sunshine College
 Sunshine Harvester Technical College
 Swinburne Senior Secondary College
 Sydney Road Community School

T
 Taylors College, Melbourne
 Taylors Lakes Secondary College
 Tarneit senior college
 Templestowe College
 The Grange P-12 College
 The Islamic Schools Of Victoria
 The King David School
 The Knox School
 The Meridian International School
 The Peninsula School
 Thomas Carr College
 Thomastown Secondary College
 Thornbury High School
 Tintern Girls Grammar School
 Toorak College
 [[Trinity Grammar School, Victoria

U
 University High School, Melbourne
 Upper Yarra Secondary College
 Upwey High School

V
 Vermont Secondary College
 Victorian College for the Deaf
 Victorian College of the Arts Secondary School
 Viewbank College
 Victoria University Secondary College -Brimbank Campus
 Victoria University Secondary College - Deer Park Campus

W
 Wantirna College
 Warrandyte High School
 Waverley Christian College
 Wellington Secondary College
 Werribee Secondary College
 Wesley College, Melbourne
 Westall Secondary College
 Western Port Secondary College
 Wheelers Hill Secondary College
 Whitefriars College
 Whittlesea Secondary College
 Williamstown High School
 William Ruthven Secondary College
 Woodleigh School
  Wesley Hill College

X
 Xavier College

Y
 Yarra Valley Grammar School
 Yeshivah College
 Yarra Hills Secondary, Mooroolbark

See also
 List of schools in Australia
 List of schools in Victoria
 List of high schools in Victoria

References

 
High schools
High schools in Melbourne